Say Yes may refer to:

Music 
 "Say Yes" (Chage and Aska song), 1991
 "Say Yes" (Burnin' Daylight song), 1997
 "Say Yes" (Dusty Drake song), 2007
 "Say Yes" (Floetry song), 2003
 "Say Yes" (Elliott Smith song), 1997
 "Say Yes" (Michelle Williams song), 2014
 "Say Yes" (Tony Moran song), 2016

Other uses 
Say Yes (film), a 2001 South Korean horror film
"Say Yes" (The Walking Dead), a 2017 television episode of The Walking Dead
Say Yes demonstrations, a series of Australian political demonstrations
"Say Yes" (short story), a short story written by Tobias Wolff in 1985